Syntaxin-7 is a protein that in humans is encoded by the STX7 gene.

In melanocytic cells STX7 gene expression may be regulated by MITF.

Interactions 

STX7 has been shown to interact with STX8, VPS18, Vesicle-associated membrane protein 8 and VPS11.

References

Further reading